The 1987–88 Loyola Marymount Lions men's basketball team represented Loyola Marymount University during the 1987–88 NCAA Division I men's basketball season. The Lions were led by third-year head coach Paul Westhead. They played their home games at Gersten Pavilion in Los Angeles, California as members of the West Coast Conference.

LMU led the nation in scoring by averaging 110.3 points per game, and won a school-record 25 consecutive games before losing to North Carolina in the second round of the NCAA tournament.

Roster

Schedule and results

|-
!colspan=12 style=| Non-conference regular season

|-
!colspan=12 style=| WCC regular season

|-
!colspan=12 style=| WCC Tournament

|-
!colspan=12 style=| NCAA Tournament

Sources

Rankings

Awards
 WCC Coach of the Year
 Paul Westhead

 WCC tournament MVP
 Hank Gathers

Records

References

Loyola Marymount Lions men's basketball seasons
Loyola Marymount
Loyola Marymount
Loyola Marymount
Loyola Marymount
Loyola Marymount
Loyola Marymount